Madeleine Chamot-Berthod (born 1 February 1931) is a Swiss former alpine skier. She was born in Château d'Oex, Vaud. Berthod was Swiss Sportspersonality of the year in 1956. She competed at the 1952, 1956 and the 1960 Winter Olympics, winning gold in the women's downhill at the 1956 Games.

References

1931 births
Living people
Swiss female alpine skiers
Olympic alpine skiers of Switzerland
Olympic gold medalists for Switzerland
Olympic medalists in alpine skiing
Medalists at the 1956 Winter Olympics
Alpine skiers at the 1952 Winter Olympics
Alpine skiers at the 1956 Winter Olympics
Alpine skiers at the 1960 Winter Olympics
People from Château-d'Œx
Sportspeople from the canton of Vaud
20th-century Swiss women